All Scratched Up! is the fourth album by Down by Law, released in 1996. The band supported the album by touring with labelmates Millencolin.

Vinyl versions of the album were released as a double album, with Side D consisting of vinyl-only bonus tracks. Three songs on the album ("True Believers", "Post Office Lament", and "True Music", one per vinyl side) end with different performances of a short song called "Counting Crows Must Die", with Side D ending in seven different versions of the song.

Critical reception
The Chicago Tribune wrote that Down by Law "blends punk and pop with knowing ease but without a whole lot of flair." The Bradenton Herald determined that "musically, 'Radio Ragga' (a melancholy reggae number) and 'Far And Away' (the catchy melody switches motifs to rolling drums and stretched guitar sounds a la The Who, then back again) are most interesting." The Tampa Tribune thought that "the band dabbles in dime-store punk and tuneless wonk with limited success."

Track listing
 "Independence Day"
 "Cheap Thrill"
 "All American"
 "Hell Song"
 "True Believers"
 "Counting Crows Must Die"
 "Giving It All Away"
 "Gruesome Gary"
 "Radio Ragga"
 "Attention: Anyone"
 "Superman"
 "Post Office Lament"
 "Counting Crows Must Die"
 "Ivory Girl"
 "No Has Beens"
 "Kevin's Song"
 "True Music"
 "Counting Crows Must Die"
 "Far And Away"
 "Punks And Drunks"
 "Memories Are Made of This" (hidden track)
Vinyl edition bonus tracks:
 Daily 
 Neon Skies
 Going Underground
 Dag Punk
 World Without Me
 Green Hills of Virginia
 Counting Crows Must Die

References

Down by Law (band) albums
1996 albums
Epitaph Records albums